Minor league baseball teams were based in Grand Island, Nebraska in various seasons between 1892 and 1959. Grand Island teams played as members of the Nebraska State League (1892 1910–1915, 1922–1923), Tri-State League (1924) and Nebraska State League (1928–1932, 1937–1938, 1956–1959), winning three league championships.

Grand Island was a minor league affiliate of the St. Louis Cardinals in 1937 and 1938 and Kansas City Athletics from 1956 to 1959.

History
From 1956 to 1959, the Nebraska State League was composed of players in their first professional season. Based in Grand Island, Nebraska, the team was an affiliate of the Kansas City Athletics. The Grand Island Athletics or "A's" played their home games at Municipal Field. The A's captured the League Championship in 1957.

Grand Island also played as a member of the Nebraska State League from 1937 to 1938, 1928–1932, 1922–1923, 1910–1915 and in 1892. Grand Island played as the Grand Island Cardinals (1938), Grand Island Red Birds (1937), the Grand Island Islanders (1929–1932, 1914), Grand Island Champs (1928), Grand Island Champions (1922-1923, 1915), Grand Island Collegians (1910-1913) and Grand Island Sugar Citys (1892). The Grand Island Islanders played in the Tri-State League for the 1924 season. Overall, Grand Island captured Nebraska State League championships in 1914, 1931 and 1957.

Many of the Grand Island players lived in Grand Island's Yancey Hotel.

The Nebraska State League permanently folded after the 1959 season, along with 1959 league members Grand Island Athletics, Hastings Giants, Holdrege White Sox, Kearney Yankees, McCook Braves and North Platte Indians. Grand Island has not hosted another minor league team.

The ballpark
The Grand Island Athletics teams played minor league home games at Municipal Field. The ballpark still exists today, within Grand Island's Ryder Park. Municipal Field is located at 202 North Custer Avenue, Grand Island, Nebraska.

Timeline

Year-by-year records

Notable alumni

 Jack Aker (1959)
 Jim Cockman (1912)
 Murry Dickson (1937) MLB All-Star
 Eddie Lake (1937)
 Lou Klimchock (1957)
 Art Mazmanian (1956–1958, MGR) 1984 USA Olympic Team coach
 Lenny Metz (1922–1923)
 Len Rice (1937)
 Jose Santiago (1959) MLB All-Star
 Fresco Thompson (1923)
 Chuck Ward (1913–1914)
 Ed Willett (1922, MGR)

References

Grand Island, Nebraska